The 2018 season is Balestier Khalsa's 23rd consecutive season in the top flight of Singapore football and in the Singapore Premier League and the Singapore Cup.

Squad

Coaching staff

Transfer

Pre-season transfer

In

Out

Retained

Promoted

Mid-season transfer

In

Friendly

Pre-Season Friendly

Team statistics

Appearances and goals

Numbers in parentheses denote appearances as substitute.

Competitions

Overview

Singapore Premier League

Singapore Cup

Balestier Khalsa won 1-0 on aggregate.

Balestier lost 2–4 on aggregate.

See also 
 2017 Balestier Khalsa FC season

References 

Balestier Khalsa
Balestier Khalsa FC seasons